The  Mufti-Jami Mosque, is located in Feodosiya, .

History
Construction began on the mosque in 1623 and was completed in 1637. The mosque was built in the tradition of Ottoman architecture. After Crimea was added to the Russian Empire the mosque became an Armenian Catholic Church. 
In 1975 efforts were made to restore the building to its original appearance. Ownership was returned to the Muslim community and in 1998 regular services began.

Photos

See also 
Islam in Ukraine
Islam in Russia
List of mosques in Russia
List of mosques in Europe

References 

Mosques in Crimea
Churches converted from mosques
Religious buildings and structures completed in 1637
17th-century mosques
Former Armenian Catholic churches
1637 establishments in Europe
Cultural heritage monuments of federal significance in Crimea